Sovin may refer to:
 Sovin, Meyaneh
 Sovin, Sarab